Nkwain is a surname. Notable people with the surname include:

Francis Nkwain (1930–2014), Cameroonian politician and educator
Stan Nkwain (fl. 2003–present), Cameroonian public servant, administrator and senior UN official in UNDP